Ferns N Petals (FNP) is an Indian gifting company founded by Vikaas Gutgutia in 1994. FNP provides flowers, cakes, plants and other gift items to customers. FNP delivers across 450+ cities & towns across India and 120+ countries worldwide

History
The journey started with FNP’s first store in New Delhi by the Founder & MD Vikaas Gutgutia in 1994. FNP introduced its E-Commerce division in 2002. And since then it has grown in leaps and bounds to become a major Gifting Portal of the country.

In the year 2020, During the COVID-19 pandemic, the company launched its Digital Gifting section that include Musician on Call (Guitarist, Violinist Flue, etc.), Celebrity Video Message, Poet on Call, Personalized App, Digital Caricatures, Personalized Video message etc.

The company started with a single store. 

In 2022, the company changed its name from 'Ferns N Petals' to 'FNP' with a new logo.

Funding
In March 2022, Ferns N Petals received a funding of INR 200 crores (USD 27 million) from Lighthouse India Fund III, Limited.

International Expansion
After having established in India, Ferns N Petals expanded into the South East Asian and Middle East space.

Advertisement
In 2020, Ferns N Petals signed Neena Gupta as a brand ambassador for its promotion.

In 2022, FNP was the official gifting partner at 22nd International Indian Film Academy Awards. In the same year, actor Anil Kapoor and Janhvi Kapoor became the brand ambassador of the company.

Ferns N Petals (FNP), a popular online gifting platform, has signed a new endorsement deal with one of India's most recognizable celebrities - The Great Khali.

Key milestones
1994- First retail outlet opened in New Delhi.
1996- Did first wedding décor assignment
2002- Launched www.fnp.com
2003- Opened first wedding venue ‘The Kundan’
2013- Launched ‘The Flagship Store’
2014- Launched Wedding Design Hub
2015- Launched www.fnp.ae for Arab Countries
2016 – Launched Udman (first hotel of the brand)
2017- Started FNP Cakes ‘N’ More
2018 – Launched ‘FNP Media’ a content & production house
2019 -Entered into FMCG business by launching FNP Water & Balloon Decoration
2020 – Launched ‘Last Journey’ personalized funeral services 
2022 - The company changed its name from 'Ferns N Petals' to 'FNP'

Retail categories
Though originally a flower retailer, the firm has also expanded into the E-commerce sector with various online ventures such as FNPcakes. It has expanded their business into the wedding and event planning industry with the name FNP Weddings & Events.

References

Retail companies of India
Florist companies
Retail companies established in 1994
Companies based in New Delhi